William C. "Skinny" Johnson (August 16, 1911 – February 5, 1980) was an American basketball player during the 1930s. As a  center Johnson was among the tallest players of his time. The Oklahoma City native attended the University of Kansas (1929–33), where he was a three-year letterwinner under coach Phog Allen. He was named First-Team Big Six Conference twice (1932, 1933) as well as Second-Team Big Six Conference (1931) once. During the 1930s he played amateur basketball with several AAU teams. He briefly coached collegiate basketball at Cleveland Chiropractic College (1937)  in Kansas City, Missouri as well. On May 2, 1977, Johnson was inducted to the Naismith Memorial Basketball Hall of Fame as a player.

External links
Hall of Fame bio

1911 births
1980 deaths
All-American college men's basketball players
Amateur Athletic Union men's basketball players
Basketball coaches from Oklahoma
Basketball players from Oklahoma
Centers (basketball)
Kansas Jayhawks men's basketball players
Naismith Memorial Basketball Hall of Fame inductees
National Collegiate Basketball Hall of Fame inductees
Sportspeople from Oklahoma City
American men's basketball players